Cees Zoontjens (10 August 1944 – 28 April 2011) was a Dutch racing cyclist. He rode in the 1970 Tour de France.

References

External links
 

1944 births
2011 deaths
Dutch male cyclists
Place of birth missing
Cyclo-cross cyclists